Eduardo Raúl Pucheta is an Argentine footballer who plays as a forward for Deportes Copiapó on loan from Vélez Sársfield.

Honours
Vélez Sársfield
Argentine Primera División (2): 2012 Inicial, 2012–13 Superfinal
Supercopa Argentina (1): 2013

References

External links
 Profile at Vélez Sarsfield's official website 
 Argentine Primera statistics at Fútbol XXI 

Living people
1992 births
Argentine footballers
Argentine expatriate footballers
Association football forwards
Club Atlético Vélez Sarsfield footballers
Deportes Copiapó footballers
Primera B de Chile players
Argentine Primera División players
Argentine expatriate sportspeople in Spain
Expatriate footballers in Chile
Expatriate footballers in Spain
Footballers from Buenos Aires